Andrei Andreyevich Popov (Russian: Андрей Андреевич Попов; (13 October 1832 – 1896) was a Russian genre painter in the Realist style.

Biography
He received his first art lessons from his father, who was a local icon painter. In 1846, he entered the Imperial Academy of Fine Arts, where he studied with Maxim Vorobiev and Bogdan Willewalde.

In 1849, he was awarded a grant by the Society for the Encouragement of Artists. For an exhibition there in 1857, he had his first critical success with "Demyan's Fish Soup", based on the fable by Ivan Krylov.

From 1858 to 1859, he worked at the Academy as an assistant to Ivan Vistelius (1802–1872), who had been a tutor to the young James McNeill Whistler during his stay in Saint Petersburg.

In 1860, his work, "The Tea Warehouse at the Nizhny Novgorod Fair" earned him a gold medal and the title of "Artist", first-class. He also received a stipend that enabled him to continue his studies in Paris (1863–65) and Rome (1865–67).

He returned to Russia in 1867, initially settling in Kaluga but eventually moving to Nizhny Novgorod. In the 1870s, his health began to decline from a chronic lung condition, possibly a form of tuberculosis, and he was often too weak to work for long periods. As a result, he painted little and had given up entirely by the early 1880s. His last known showing was at the Pan-Russian Exhibition of Art and Industry in Moscow in 1882. He died in poverty.

Selected paintings

References

External links

1832 births
1896 deaths
19th-century painters from the Russian Empire
Russian male painters
Russian genre painters
People from Tula, Russia
19th-century deaths from tuberculosis
19th-century male artists from the Russian Empire
Tuberculosis deaths in Russia